"Eres Para Mí" (English: "You are for Me") is a Latin pop-Hip hop song by the Mexican singer-songwriter Julieta Venegas and the Chilean singer Anita Tijoux. It was recorded for  Julieta Venegas's studio album Limón y Sal. Released as the third single on January 1, 2007. It had the same success as her first single "Me Voy" in Latin America appearing at the top of the pop charts.

Song information 

The song is a duo featuring Chilean rapper, Anita Tijoux and has grown to become one of Venegas's most successful songs in the U.S. Hot Latin Charts, reaching a peak of 5 in just a few weeks and # 2 in Latin Pop Airplay. It is in the key of B minor and 4/4 time.

Music video 

The music video for "Eres Para Mí", directed by Sebastián Sánchez, who had previously worked with Babasónicos. It was recorded in Buenos Aires, Argentina in the Republic of the Children, which represents a miniature city for children. The video was released on January 29, 2007, by MTV Latin America.

The video begins with Julieta in a fancy purple dress driving a yellow car while listening to Limón y Sal. When she parks and goes out of the car, she enters a colorful village where she comes across with a series of workers, such as a saleswoman, a nun, a construction worker, a man dressed as an octopus handing out fliers, a policewoman chasing a thief and a snack vendor.

Anita Tijoux is then seen walking and rapping calmly while being followed by the previous crowd, just to be joined by Venegas when the chorus begins again. The whole group then moves to the middle of the street and engages in a calm choreography while the women sing the rest of the song.

Track listing 
Digital Download
"Eres Para Mí" featuring Anita Tijoux — 3:16

CD Single
"Eres Para Mí" featuring Anita Tijoux — 3:16

Charts and certifications

Weekly charts

Certifications

Versions 

"Eres Para Mí" has had several versions that have sought to experience different rhythms with the letter:

Eres Para Mí (Original feat. Anita Tijoux)
Eres Para Mí (Sonidero Nacional and Celso Piña Version)
Eres Para Mí feat. Daddy Yankee and Kinky in Los Premios MTV Latinoamérica 2006
Eres Para Mí (Mix Disco Antromix)
Eres Para Mí (Pepsi-Navidad feat. Daddy Yankee)
Eres Para Mí (MTV Unplugged (Julieta Venegas) feat. La Mala Rodríguez)

References 

Julieta Venegas songs
Song recordings produced by Cachorro López
Songs written by Julieta Venegas
2006 songs